Tanak-e Sofla (also Romanized as Ţanāk-e Soflá; also known as Tanāk-e Pā’īn and Ţanāk-e Pā’īn) is a village in Mud Rural District, Mud District, Sarbisheh County, South Khorasan Province, Iran. At the 2006 census, its population was 199, in 54 families.

References 

Populated places in Sarbisheh County